Gjokaj is a village in Tirana County, Albania. It is part of the municipality Vorë.

References 

Populated places in Vorë
Villages in Tirana County